Patrick Lechner (born 12 December 1988) is a German racing cyclist, who currently rides for German amateur team Gunsha–KMC. He rode in the men's team time trial at the 2016 UCI Road World Championships.

References

External links
 

1988 births
Living people
German male cyclists
Place of birth missing (living people)
People from Landau
Cyclists from Rhineland-Palatinate
21st-century German people